Zach Everson is an American journalist best known for his 1100 Pennsylvania newsletter that reports on Donald Trump’s alleged use of his presidency for personal gain. Previously Everson was a travel and food writer.

Career
Everson has reported about the Trump Organization for publications including Vanity Fair, Politico, Slate, Mother Jones, and ProPublica and WNYC Studios' Trump, Inc.

As a travel writer, Everson reported on the Trump International Hotel Washington, D.C.’s opening for Fox News in October 2016 and later for Condé Nast Traveler. That article on the 2018 Lowell Thomas Gold Award for Travel News/Investigative Reporting from the Society of American Travel Writers.

He later quit travel writing to report full-time on the Trump D.C. hotel.

Everson often uses open-source intelligence to identify customers at Trump properties. In Commentary Magazine, journalist Matthew Continetti complimented Everson's tracking of Trump's possible conflicts, but suggested Everson was playing to liberal biases.

As of February 2020, Everson had spotted 25 Trump cabinet members at the hotel and 32 of the 53 Republicans serving in the Senate. And he spotted representatives of at least 33 foreign countries through October 2010.

In 2021, after Trump's departure from the White House, Everson joined business magazine Forbes to cover money in politics. In late August 2021, the Trump International Hotel in Washington banned Everson for life; he was told this was for taking photos without permission but Everson suspects it's just retribution for unflattering coverage.

References

External links 
Official Site
1100 Pennsylvania newsletter

Living people
American travel writers
21st-century American journalists
Year of birth missing (living people)